Ugo Nespolo (born 29 August 1941 in Mosso, Biella) is an Italian artist, painter, sculptor, film-maker and writer. He lives and works in Turin.

Life and works
Nespolo graduated at the Accademia Albertina di Belle Arti of Turin with Enrico Paulucci and obtained a degree in Modern Literature at the University of Turin, with a thesis on Semiology.

His career as an artist started in the 1960s. His work was influenced by Pop Art, which was becoming popular in Italy in those years, conceptual art, Arte Povera and Fluxus. He had a chance to see and appreciate closely these movements during a trip to the United States in 1967. He would then continue to regularly visit the States, where he would spend long periods of time, especially during the 1980s. Irony and transgression became key element in Nespolo's art and characterised his work for many years to come.
Since 2010 he has been member of the Honour Committee of "Immagine & Poesia", an artistic literary movement founded in Turin, with the patronage of Aeronwy Thomas (Dylan Thomas's daughter). In 2016 he signed the pptArt Manifesto, an international art movement that promote many notable initiatives like the Corporate Art Awards.

Cinema
In the mid-1960s Nespolo started to work with experimental cinema. His first film, Grazie, mamma Kodak, is from 1966. His friends and fellow artists such as Lucio Fontana, Enrico Baj, Michelangelo Pistoletto and others appeared regularly in his films. Nespolo's second film, A.G. (1968), documents the visit in Turin of Allen Ginsberg. In 2001 he directed Film/a/TO, with the main charachter role played by Edoardo Sanguineti. Nespolo's films have been exhibited in institutions like the Beaubourg in Paris, the Philadelphia Museum of Modern Art, Warsaw's Filmoteka Polska and Ferrara's Galleria Civica d'Arte Moderna. Nespolo has produced and direcyed about twenty films over forty years.

Applied arts

In the 1980s, Nespolo made ceramics and blown glass objects, created over fifty posters for exhibitions and other events, did advertising campaigns for Campari and Azzurra and realised title sequences for shows on the Italian national broadcast television RAI. In 2002, Nespolo was appointed artistic coordinator for the Metropolitana di Torino, with the aim of realising the first "underground museum of modern art". Several underground stations are decorated with his glass etchings and images.

Theatre
In 1986 Nespolo had the possibility of designing the stage sets for Ferruccio Busoni’s opera Turandot at Connecticut Grand Opera, Stamford, the first of several theatre works he made in the following years, such as the sets and costumes for Paisiello's Don Chisciotte at the Teatro dell'Opera di Roma in 1990 and for Donizetti's L'elisir d'amore, a production for the Rome Opera, the Paris Opera and the Lausanne Opera, Liège and Metz in 1995. In 2007, he designed stage and costumes for Puccini's Madama Butterfly at the Festival Puccini 2007 in Torre del Lago.

Palio and traditions
Nespolo was appreciated also for his work with Palios. In 1998, he was committed the Palio for the Giostra della Quintana, Ascoli Piceno. In 2000, he was awarded for his work for Palio di Asti and in 1991 and 2009 for the Palio of the Giostra della Quintana in Foligno. He was chosen to design the Palio (Drappellone or banner) at the Palio dell'Assunta in August 2007.

Selected exhibitions
Nespolo's works covering his whole production have been presented or hosted in major national and international exhibitions, .

A selected list of exhibitions and venues is the following:
Ugo Nespolo, Palazzo Reale Arengario, Milan, 1990
International Biennale of Ceramics and Antiques, Faenza Exhibition Center, 1990
International Ceramics Festival, Shigaraki Ceramic World, Japan, 1991
A Fine Intolerance (Nespolo's paintings and ceramics), Borghi and Co. Gallery, New York, 1992
Casa d'Arte Nespolo, Palazzo della Permanenente, Milan, 1995
Romanian Ministry of Culture, Bucharest, 1995
Le Stanze dell'Arte, Promotrice delle Belle Arti, Turin, 1996
National Museum of Fine Arts in Valletta, Malta, 1997
Itinerant exhibition, 1997:
Museo Nacional de Bellas Artes, Buenos Aires
Centro de Arte Contemporaneo de Cordoba, Chateau Carrera, Córdoba
Museo Municipal de Arte Moderno de Mendoza, Mendoza
Museo Nacional de Artes Visuales, Montevideo
Rocca Paolina/Spello Villa Fidelia, Perugia, 1999
Palazzo Reale, Naples, 2000
Turin, berceau du cinéma italien, Centre Pompidou, Paris, 2001
2001 Italy in Japan, Fukui, Japan, 2001
International Sculpture at La Mandria, Villa dei Laghi, Venaria Reale (Turin), 2002
Itinerant exhibition in Eastern Europe, 2003:
Modern Art Gallery, Moscow
St. Petersburg
Minsk
Modern Art Gallery Riga, Latvia
Istituto Italiano di Cultura, Paris, 2003
International Film Festival of Locarno, Switzerland, 2003
Chinese National Museum of Peking, 2003
Ciurlionis National Museum of Art, Vilnius, Lithuania, 2004
Guang Dong Museum of Art of Guangzhou, Canton, China, 2004
Moscow Museum of Modern Art, Moscow, 2004
Fine Arts Russian Academy, St. Petersburg, 2004
Poldi Pezzoli Museum, Milan, 2005
Hong Kong Cultural Centre, Hong Kong, 2005
Dentro e Fuori, Museo Nazionale del Cinema of Turin, 2005
Museo del Cinema of Turin, 2008
Italics, organized with the Chicago Museum of Contemporary Art, Palazzo Grassi, Venice, 2008
48th Ceramics Exhibition of Castellamonte, 2008
Nespolo. Ritorno a casa. Un percorso antologico, Biella, Italy, 2009

Filmography
Nespolo's filmography includes:

References

External links
Official site

1941 births
Living people
20th-century Italian painters
Italian male painters
Italian contemporary artists
Film people from Turin
University of Turin alumni
People from Mosso
20th-century Italian male artists